Matthew Simpson Dudgeon (June 18, 1871July 26, 1949) was director of the Milwaukee Public Library from 1920 to 1941. Earlier, he was a member of the Wisconsin State Assembly, representing Madison in the 1903 session, and served four years as district attorney of Dane County, Wisconsin.

Biography
Matthew Dudgeon was born in Madison, Wisconsin. He served as director of the Milwaukee Public Library and president of the Wisconsin Library Association and was inducted into the Wisconsin Library Hall of Fame in 2009. Dudgeon died in Milwaukee in 1949.

Political career
Dudgeon was elected to the Assembly in 1902. Previously, he served two terms as district attorney of Dane County, Wisconsin. He was a Republican.

References

External links

The Political Graveyard

1871 births
1949 deaths
Politicians from Madison, Wisconsin
Republican Party members of the Wisconsin State Assembly
District attorneys in Wisconsin
Lawyers from Madison, Wisconsin
American librarians
American volunteer soldiers of the Spanish–American War
20th-century American politicians